Rameshwar Sahu  (born 1 November 1919, date of death unknown) was an Indian politician. He was elected to the Lok Sabha, the lower house of the Parliament of India from the Rosera in Bihar as a member of the Indian National Congress. He was Deputy Finance Minister of India  from 1964 - 1965. He was Chairman of all India Railway in 1971-1972. He left his politics carrier in 1972.

References

External links
Official biographical sketch in Parliament of India website

1919 births
Year of death missing
India MPs 1952–1957
India MPs 1957–1962
India MPs 1962–1967
Indian National Congress politicians